The Pointe des Espagnols is the north-east extremity of the Roscanvel peninsula, an outgrowth of the Crozon peninsula closing off the roadstead of Brest.  It also marks the south-east limit of the goulet de Brest (the other limits are marked by  pointe des Capucins, pointe du Petit Minou and pointe du Portzic).

Formed by a cliff that is more than 60m high, at whose summit and base are the remains of fortifications and barracks, the point reaches towards the north-east via the rocher de la Cormorandière, marked by a pole.  The straight channel situated between the point and the rocher is the location for strong currents which affect the roadstead.

This strategic position, facing Brest, was already noted by the Duchy of Brittany, who sited a fortlet there in 1387 (now lost).  In 1594, Spaniards landed here and were only dislodged after several battles - it was in this period that the cape first took on its present name.

Battle of 1594

Fortifications

The known works are:
 Fortlet (fortin) of the Dukes of Brittany (1387) - Disappeared
 Fortin des Espagnols (1594) - Disappeared
 Lower battery (1695) - built to plans by Vauban, on a platform re-using a mine at the bottom of the cliff
 Fort (1749) - 
 Tour modèle n°1 (1812) - see Tour-modèle type 1811.  Battlements destroyed by the Germans
 Underground battery (1888) - embrazures topped by a German blockhouse in 1942
 External battery (1890 - 1891)
 Magazines and underground battery (1890)
 DCA battery (1942)

Notes

External links
 Fort des Espagnols (general inventory)
 fortifications (photos)

Geography of Brest, France
Fortifications of Brest, France
Tourist attractions in Finistère